The PC&Y Railroad Bridge carries a single railroad track over the Ohio River, between Stowe Township, Allegheny County, Pennsylvania and Neville Island, Pennsylvania.

Description
Built in 1894, this through truss railroad bridge once served the Pittsburgh, Chartiers & Youghiogheny Railroad. Previously used for the PC&Y's transport of tinplate scrap from Pittsburgh's Federal Street station to Neville Island, it spans the back channel of the Ohio River, and is still in use today. A single rail line crosses the bridge, connecting chemical plants on the industrial half of the island with the Pittsburgh and Ohio Central Railroad mainline.

References

Bridges over the Ohio River
Bridges completed in 1894
Bridges in Allegheny County, Pennsylvania
Railroad bridges in Pennsylvania
Girder bridges in the United States
Warren truss bridges in the United States
Pratt truss bridges in the United States